Vakarchuk is a surname. Notable people with the surname include:

Ivan Vakarchuk (1947–2020), Ukrainian physicist, politician, and social activist
Svyatoslav Vakarchuk (born 1975), Ukrainian musician, politician, and public activist

See also
 

Ukrainian-language surnames